Shawn Rodrigue-Lemieux (born 2004) is a Canadian international chess master who won the 2022 World Under 18 Chess Championship.

Chess career
He finished an international tournament with 9 straight victories, no losses and a performance rating of 3037. By becoming the World Youth Chess Champion in the under 18 section, he earned his first grandmaster norm, became only the second Canadian to win a World Youth Chess Championship and the first Canadian over 14 to win the Youth Chess Championship. He is currently on track to become the youngest grandmaster in Quebec's history.

Son of Isabelle Rodrigue, Shawn learned to play chess at age 6 at an after school program and quickly fell in love with the game. In his first event, at 6, he won five straight games, and at 12, he had a FIDE rating of over 2000. He became an International Master at 18.

Playing style

In 2022, Rodrigue-Lemieux played 2 exhibition games against Hikaru Nakamura and was one of the few people to hold him to a draw in one of his games.
An unorthodox player, Rodrigue Lemieux is known to use uncommon openings with regularity, most notably Anderssen's Opening. He has stated that his use of uncommon openings throws opponents off, and might be useful in getting well prepared players out of book early on. His favourite player is Magnus Carlsen whom he hopes to beat in the future. 

His 3037 tournament performance where he won 9/9 created a social media buzz, drawing attention from popular streamers like Gotham Chess.

Personal life
Rodrigue-Lemieux is a French-Canadian residing in Montreal. He first discovered his interest in chess in Grade 1 where he saw his classmates playing and signed up for chess classes.

He is currently enrolled in Collège de Maisonneuve where he majors in law. 

Rodrigue-Lemieux is devoted to McDonald's fast food chain, and even credits it to his successful results.

References

Living people

2004 births
Canadian chess players